Events from the year 1550 in the Kingdom of Scotland.

Incumbents
Monarch – Mary I

Events
 24 March – The Treaty of Boulogne ends the hostilities with England known as the Rough Wooing

Births
 1 February – John Napier, physicist, astronomer and mathematician, discoverer of logarithms (died 1617)

See also
 Timeline of Scottish history
 1550 in England
 1550 in Wales
 1550 in Ireland

References

 
Years of the 16th century in Scotland